The 1973 Barnett Bank Classic was a women's tennis tournament played on outdoor hard courts at the Miami Jockey Club in Miami, Florida in the United States that was part of the 1973 Virginia Slims World Championship Series. It was the second edition of the tournament and was held from February 6 through February 11, 1973. Second-seeded Margaret Court won the singles title and earned $7,000 first-prize money.

Finals

Singles
 Margaret Court defeated  Kerry Melville 4–6, 6–1, 7–5

Doubles
 Françoise Dürr /  Betty Stöve defeated  Rosie Casals /  Billie Jean King 4–6, 6–2, 6–3

References

Barnett Bank Classic